The 1998 International Formula 3000 Championship was the thirty-second season of the second-tier of Formula One feeder championship and also fourteenth season under the International Formula 3000 Championship moniker. The championship was contested over twelve rounds from 11 April to 26 September 1998. The Drivers' Championship was won by Colombian Juan Pablo Montoya of Super Nova Racing, who won four races.

Drivers and teams

Calendar
1998 was the last International F3000 season where races were held independently from Formula One Grands Prix. Pau and Pergusa had held International F3000 and previously European Formula Two Championship races uninterruptedly since 1972.

Season summary
After winning the 1997 championship with Ricardo Zonta, Super Nova Racing chose to recruit championship runner-up Juan Pablo Montoya to lead their main team, and also expanded their second Den Blå Avis team to two cars by hiring Gareth Rees to partner Jason Watt. Montoya's former team RSM Marko did not compete in 1998, but there were new entries from GT specialists Oreca and the new West Competition team, established as a McLaren junior team and run by former Williams race engineer David Brown.

With seven pole positions, Montoya was the fastest man in the championship all season, but a poor start to the season left him trailing several title rivals. In the event, the championship turned into a duel between the Colombian and newcomer Nick Heidfeld, who remained consistent throughout the season despite his relative inexperience. Watt often matched their pace but made several key mistakes costing him points, while Uruguay's Gonzalo Rodriguez finished the season strongly with two wins in the last three races, becoming the first driver from the South American nation to win a Formula 3000 event.

Montoya led Heidfeld by three points going into the final round at the Nürburgring. However, after qualifying second on the grid, Heidfeld's times were deleted and he was relegated to the back of the grid, only making the race after Brown withdrew his new teammate Bas Leinders from the event. Despite recovering through the field, Heidfeld failed to climb into the top six, and Montoya's third-place finish clinched him the championship. Rodriguez beat Watt to the race win and third place in the standings.

Montoya moved to the North American CART series for 1999 with Chip Ganassi Racing, going on to win the championship as a rookie. He went on to graduate to Formula One with Williams in 2001, and became the only International Formula 3000 champion to win more than one grand prix in his career. The only driver from the field to participate in Formula One in 1999 was Stéphane Sarrazin, who secured a one-off drive in the Brazilian Grand Prix for Minardi in place of the injured Luca Badoer. Most of the leading Formula 3000 drivers instead remained in the series for 1999.

Drivers' Championship

Notes
All drivers used Lola T96/50 chassis, with Zytek-Judd V8 engines, and Avon tyres.
Paolo Ruberti was disqualified from third place at Oschersleben due to a bodywork infringement.

Complete Overview

R22=retired, but classified R=retired NC=not classified NS=did not start NQ=did not qualify DIS(3)=disqualified after finishing in third place (16)=place after practice, but grid position not held free

References

International Formula 3000
International Formula 3000 seasons
Formula 3000